Rejtő is a surname and may refer to:

 Jenő Rejtő (Reich) (pseudonyms: P. Howard, Gibson Lavery; 1905–1943), Hungarian author, science fiction writer, playwright
 Gábor Rejtő (1916–1987), Hungarian cellist
 Ildikó Újlaky-Rejtő (born 1937), Hungarian Olympic and world champion foil fencer

Hungarian-language surnames